No Man's Heath is an area of North Warwickshire about  northeast of Tamworth. It is near the boundaries of four English counties:  Derbyshire, Leicestershire, Warwickshire and Staffordshire. Nearby in the late 19th century were Netherseal Colliery and Netherseal Hall. Today a small village exists here, also called No Man's Heath, which is the northernmost settlement in Warwickshire. The population of the village is included in Newton Regis. The county boundary which used to divide the village between Leicestershire and Warwickshire has been re-drawn to place the whole village in Warwickshire. 

The village has an Indian restaurant called The Four Counties Spice; this used to be the village public house, called The Four Counties Inn. 

Derbyshire, Leicestershire, and Staffordshire meet a further half-mile northwest. There is an ancient (probably Mercian) stone, divided into four parts, which may mark the point where the four counties met before boundary adjustments.

See also
 Dow Bridge, meeting point of Warwickshire, Northamptonshire and Leicestershire.
 Four Shire Stone, meeting point of Warwickshire, Oxfordshire and Gloucestershire (formerly also Worcestershire)

References

External links
BBC Staffordshire article about the Four Counties Inn, 2006

Villages in Warwickshire
Borough of North Warwickshire